Masato Fukae (深江 真登, born September 5, 1987, in Sagamihara) is a Japanese former professional baseball outfielder. He previously played in Nippon Professional Baseball for the Orix Buffaloes from 2011 to 2013.

External links

1987 births
Living people
People from Sagamihara
Japanese expatriate baseball players in the United States
Nippon Professional Baseball outfielders
Orix Buffaloes players
Lancaster Barnstormers players
Gary SouthShore RailCats players
Melbourne Aces players
Japanese expatriate baseball players in Australia